Yehoshua Yakhot (Russian: Иегошуа Яхот/Овший Овшиевич Яхот; 2 March 1919, in Yaryshev – 21 December 2003, in Tel Aviv) was a professor of philosophy in the Soviet Union. In 1975 he was forced to emigrate to Israel.

Works 
 What is dialectical materialism?
 The basic principles of dialectical and historical materialism
 Materialist view on reality
 Philosophy of the new world
 The Suppression of Philosophy in the USSR (The 1920s & 1930s)

External links 
 Frederick Choate: Preface to Yakhot’s history of early Soviet philosophy

Soviet philosophers
1919 births
2003 deaths
Soviet emigrants to Israel
20th-century Russian philosophers
Marxist theorists
20th-century Ukrainian people